Eimer Ní Mhaoldomhnaigh is an Irish costume designer. Much of her career has been in Irish and British-Irish productions, such as Michael Collins (1996), The Wind That Shakes the Barley (2006), Brideshead Revisited (2008) and Ondine (2009). She has been nominated six times for Best Costume Design from the Irish Film & Television Academy.

Career
Eimer Ní Mhaoldomhnaigh is from Limerick, Ireland where she graduated from the Limerick School of Art and Design. Her name is Irish. She studied fashion before moving into film, contacting costume designers in the hopes of gaining a job. After graduating from college, she perceived a paucity of job opportunities in fashion and moved with a friend to Madrid. Ní Mhaoldomhnaigh began aiding in the productions of film students she was living with, later noting that it "was very basic, but it got the interest going. We were broke, but it was a brilliant time to be over there, just the whole cultural aspect to it".

When Ní Mhaoldomhnaigh returned to Ireland in 1991, she earned a job as a costume assistant on the film The Secret of Roan Inish, beginning her career in the film industry. The Irish Independent notes that "the Irish film scene was picking up in the Nineties and Eimer's cv is like a history of Irish film since 1993". During that decade, she held supporting positions in such productions as the comedy film Widows' Peak, the series Family, the miniseries Scarlett, and the historical drama film Michael Collins.

For her collaboration with costume designers Joan Bergin and Susan Scott in the 2000 television drama David Copperfield, Ní Mhaoldomhnaigh received a nomination for the Primetime Emmy Award for Outstanding Costumes for a Miniseries, Movie or a Special.

2000s–present
Beginning with the 2003 television film Watermelon, the Irish Film & Television Academy has awarded her six ITFA nominations for Best Costume Design. In 2005, Ní Mhaoldomhnaigh oversaw the costumes on the comedy-drama film Breakfast on Pluto, which featured Cillian Murphy as a transgender woman. The following year, she again worked with Murphy on the drama film The Wind That Shakes the Barley, directed by Ken Loach.

In 2007, she served as costume designer on the period drama film Becoming Jane, which was directed by Julian Jarrold and depicted the purported life of the English author Jane Austen. In comparison to most adaptations of Austen's works, Becoming Jane was set in an earlier period and thus featured different fashions. Ní Mhaoldomhnaigh said, "The really high waists were not yet fashionable and I wanted Jane's world to have a simple country feel to it, so her dresses are very plain in shape and structure". She oversaw approximately 3,000 costumes during the production.

In 2008 she oversaw the costumes for the film Brideshead Revisited, again directed by Jarrold. The original 1981 serial had left a lasting impression on fashion designers as well as lovers of English culture, leading Ní Mhaoldomhnaigh to pivot in another direction and attempt something different. Her production included vintage costumes made in Paris and London, featuring bright colours and different textures. Ní Mhaoldomhnaigh said that she "wanted everything to look beautiful and fresh. Normally with period films you're trying to make things look old and battered, but there's none of that". The director encouraged her to spend freely in order to nail every detail. For her work in the film, the Irish Film & Television Academy gave her an ITFA nomination for Best Costume Design.

The following year, she earned an ITFA nomination for her costume work in the 2009 film Ondine starring Colin Farrell. At the Gate Theatre in Dublin, Ní Mhaoldomhnaigh was the costume designer for the 2011 stage production Little Women, a stage adaptation of the 1868 novel by Louisa May Alcott. A reviewer in Irish Theatre Magazine praised Ní Mhaoldomhnaigh's efforts, writing that the "costumes are the real visual treat here, with the staid and stately conservatism of Civil War era dress recreated with great detail and grace".

That year, she also created the costumes featured in the 2011 miniseries Neverland, a re-imagining of the Peter Pan story. Ní Mhaoldomhnaigh drew from 19th-century materials when designing for the production, and studied different corset designs for the lead female character, played by the actress Anna Friel. Friel explained how costume design related to her character, Captain Elizabeth Bonny, "It's a lot about her bosoms and how she uses them; they're quite a big element of the part. And with the leather trousers, it's such a sexy, manly way to dress a woman and it's very much an armour".

In 2014, Ní Mhaoldomhnaigh oversaw the costumes in the Irish film Jimmy's Hall, her second collaboration with Ken Loach. She received an ITFA nomination for her work in the film. In late 2015, she and the costume historian Veerle Dehaene curated an exhibition of Irish film costumes at The Little Museum of Dublin. Ní Mhaoldomhnaigh acquired the idea after noticing the tendency of some film executives to dispose of costumes once their production wrapped. She pulled from her own assortment of costumes, which included a pair of underwear worn by Daniel Day-Lewis in In the Name of the Father, while collaborating with others to build a collection for the exhibition. It ran until mid-October 2015.

In 2016, Ní Mhaoldomhnaigh designed the costumes for the period comedy film Love & Friendship. The following year, she created the costumes featured in the BBC miniseries Little Women.

Select filmography

 About Adam (2000)
 Mad About Mambo (2000)
 In America (2002)
 The Wind That Shakes the Barley (2006)
 Becoming Jane (2007)
 Strength and Honour (2007)
 Brideshead Revisited (2008)
 Ondine (2009)
 Leap Year (2010)
 The Guard (2011)
 Neverland (2011)
 Calvary (2014)
 Jimmy's Hall (2014)
 Love & Friendship (2016)
Little Women (2017)
Foundation (2021)
The Banshees of Inisherin (2022)

References

External links
 

Irish costume designers
20th-century Irish people
21st-century Irish people
Living people
Artists from Limerick (city)
Alumni of the Limerick School of Art and Design
Year of birth missing (living people)